Kerpen Castle is the name of several castles in Germany:

Kerpen Castle (Eifel) near Kerpen in Rhineland-Palatinate
Kerpen Castle (Rhein-Erft) in Kerpen in Rhein-Erft-Kreis, North Rhine-Westphalia
Kerpen Castle (Saarland) in Illingen in the Saarland